Shweta Sinha is an Indian television actress best known for her portrayal of Pari Bhardwaj in Colors TV's popular long running soap opera Sasural Simar Ka. She hails from Nagpur, Maharashtra, India.

Television

References

Living people
Indian television actresses
Actresses from Maharashtra
People from Nagpur
Year of birth missing (living people)
Female models from Maharashtra